The Babylon Movement is a Chaldean Catholic political party situated in Iraq. Founded in 2014, it is the political wing of the Babylon Brigades, a nominally Christian militia that was formed as part of Iraq's Popular Mobilization Forces. Rayan al-Kildani, a Chaldean Catholic with close ties to the Badr Organization and IRGC, heads both the party and militia.

History
The Babylon Movement entered the Iraqi parliamentary elections in 2014 and 2018 as a movement claiming to be a representative of Iraq's Christian community. With a few thousand votes, Christians in Iraq considered this list as strange and intrusive and its sudden appearance without any history or previous achievements.

According to a report from the Assyrian Policy Institute, the Babylon Movement is a fringe group with little ties to the Christian community in Iraq. It is pro-Iran and is a proxy of the Shia Arab dominated Badr Organization. Its affiliated militia, the Babylon Brigades (or Brigade 50), was founded by the Iranian-controlled Kata’ib al-Imam Ali. While it is often presented as a Chaldean Catholic and Christian force, it is composed mainly of Shia Arab and Shabak soldiers.

Relations with the Chaldean Catholic Church
The Chaldean Catholic Church issued a statement confirming that it has nothing to do with the Babylon Brigades, nor its leader, Rayan Al-Kaldani, nor does it represent them, and that its official representatives are members of the Iraqi Parliament only. It was also denied by Christian members of the Iraqi Parliament, including Imad Youkhana and Yonadam Kanna, where the representatives stated that the Babylon Brigades and their leader do not represent Christians, and the battalions led by him represent him personally, and he is far from Christianity, completely against it, and does not represent it.

Sanctions
On July 18, 2019, the U.S. Treasury Department sanctioned the leader of the Babylon Brigades militia, Rayan Al-Kaldani, for committing grave human rights violations.

References

2014 establishments in Iraq
Political parties established in 2014
Assyrians in Iraq
Christianity in Iraq
Political parties in Iraq
Political parties of minorities in Iraq
Assyrian organizations
Christian democratic parties in Asia
Iraqi Christians
Syriac Christianity
Christian organizations